Setteri is a village situated in the Bangarupalyam mandal of the Chittoor District in Andhra Pradesh. It is about fifteen km from Kanipakam. It enjoys a cool climate all over the calendar year with abundant water and natural resources.

Geography
Setteri is located near to the main highway NH4 between Chennai and Bangalore, and almost exactly midway between the two cities. It is approximately 33 km from Chittoor and close to Tirupati, Tiruttani, Mogili, Kanipakam and Ardhagiri temples.
Setteri is well known for green mango orchards, jaggery production, groundnuts and has several freshwater springs.

Demographics
In the 2011 census, the population of Setteri was 1,275 people.

References 

Villages in Chittoor district